The Lamentation over the Dead Christ is a 1634-40 painting by the Flemish artist Anthony van Dyck. One of his last treatments of the subject, it is now in the Bilbao Fine Arts Museum, having entered it in 1985. It was previously in the collection of Henry Pelham-Clinton, 7th Duke of Newcastle, before later passing into the Valdes Izaguirre collection.

References

1640 paintings
Angels in art
Religious paintings by Anthony van Dyck
Paintings depicting Mary Magdalene
Paintings of the Virgin Mary
van Dyck